Christopher Læssø (born 1985) is a Danish actor and TV presenter.

Selected filmography
A Man Comes Home (2007)
The Square (2017)

Selected television
Heartless (2014)
Danmark Har Talent (2014–present)

References

External links

1985 births
Living people
Danish male film actors
Danish male television actors